The Dream Synopsis is an extended play by English supergroup The Last Shadow Puppets, released on 2 December 2016 by Domino Recording Company. It was produced by Patrick Higgins in Hudson, New York and  contains re-recordings of two songs from the band's second album, Everything You've Come to Expect, as well as four cover versions that the band played during their 2016 tour. The album artwork features a still picture of the band recording the music video for their cover of "Is This What You Wanted". It was the final release of the band's second period of activity.

Background and recording
The Dream Synopsis EP was recorded in one day at Future-Past Studios in August 2016. The songs featured on the release were recorded live in the studio.

Release and promotion
On 17 October 2016, the band announced the EP was going to be released on 2 December of that same year, digitally, on CD, and on a limited edition red vinyl.

Singles and Music videos
The lead single, a cover of Leonard Cohen's "Is This What You Wanted" was released on 17 October with an accompanying music video directed by Ben Chappell and Aaron Brown. It features the band performing the track live on a sound stage.

On 14 November they released a music video, directed by Ben Chapell, for their rendition of Jacques Dutronc's "Les Cactus". Once again the band appears performing the song live at a music studio.

Their next video, a cover Glaxo Babies's "This Is Your Life", was released on 5 December and followed the formula of the previous ones, with the band performing the song live on a catwalk.

Reception

Track listing

Personnel

The Last Shadow Puppets
 Alex Turner
 Miles Kane
 James Ford
 Zachary Dawes

Additional musicians
 Tyler Parkford – keyboards, backing vocals
 Loren Humphrey – drums, percussion
 Scott Gillies – guitar
 Jordan Pettay – saxophone

Production
 Patrick Higgins – recording
 James Ford – mixing
 Matt Colton – mastering

Orchestrations
 Owen Pallett – arrangement
 Caroline Buckman – violin
 Claudia Chopek – violin
 Jennifer Takamatsu – violin
 Mikala Schmitz – cello

Artwork
 Matthew Cooper – design

Charts

References

2016 EPs
The Last Shadow Puppets albums